Ella Sophia Armitage (3 March 1841 – 20 March 1931) was an English historian and archaeologist.

Life
Armitage was born Ella Sophia Bulley in Liverpool, the second daughter of Samuel Marshall Bulley, a cotton merchant, and Mary Rachel Raffles.  In October 1871 she was one of the first students to enter Newnham College, Cambridge. Two of her sisters also attended Newnham, including Amy Bulley who sat the tripos.

In 1874 Armitage became the college's first research student. In the same year she married the Reverend Elkanah Armitage, with whom she had two children. From 1877 to 1879 she taught history at Owens College, Manchester with her sister Amy, and in 1919 was awarded an honorary degree from Manchester. In Manchester she developed her interest in mediaeval earthworks and castles. In 1887 she became the first woman on the school board at Rotherham, and in 1894 she was appointed assistant commissioner to James Bryce on the Royal Commission on Secondary Education to investigate girls' education in Devon.

Armitage – along with John Horace Round, George Neilson, and Goddard Henry Orpen – proved in a string of publications that British motte-and-bailey castles, which had previously been assumed to be of Anglo-Saxon origin, were not constructed until after the 1066 Norman conquest of England. Her book The Early Norman Castles of the British Isles is considered a seminal work on the subject. She also contributed to volume 2 of the Victoria County History, of Yorkshire, writing on ancient earthworks.

She was also known as a hymnwriter, apparently saying "I believe I was intended by nature for an archaeologist, but life has made me a hymn writer, and I shall be content to be known as such when my archaeology is forgotten." In 1881 she published sixteen hymns in the collection The Garden of the Lord.

Bibliography

References

Further reading

External links

 

1841 births
1931 deaths
19th-century British  archaeologists
19th-century English historians
Women's rights activists from Liverpool
Alumni of Newnham College, Cambridge
Academics of the Victoria University of Manchester
Castellologists
British women archaeologists
British women historians
British women hymnwriters
Contributors to the Victoria County History